Dmytro Volodymyrovych Shastal (born 30 December 1995) is a Ukrainian professional footballer who plays as a forward for Polissya Zhytomyr.

Career
Shastal is a product of several sports schools in Kyiv including Sports School Zmina Kyiv and Piddubny Olympic College. In 2014 Shastal started to play for the Kolos Kovalivka in the national amateur competitions. He made his professional debut for Poltava in the away match against Dynamo-2 Kyiv on 21 March 2015 in the Ukrainian First League in a 0-2 loss.

References

External links
 
 
 

1995 births
Living people
Piddubny Olympic College alumni
Footballers from Kyiv
Ukrainian footballers
Association football forwards
FC Kolos Kovalivka players
FC Poltava players
FC Enerhiya Nova Kakhovka players
FC Oleksandriya players
FC Polissya Zhytomyr players
Ukrainian Premier League players
Ukrainian First League players
Ukrainian Second League players